Rastamau is a village in Singhpur block of Rae Bareli district, Uttar Pradesh, India. It hosts a market twice per week, on Mondays and Thursdays, and grain is the main article of trade. As of 2011, Rastamau has a population of 7,859, in 1,222 households.

The 1961 census recorded Rastamau as comprising 13 hamlets, with a total population of 2,681 people (1,222 male and 1,459 female), in 547 households and 519 physical houses. The area of the village was given as 1,761acres and it had a post office at that point. Average attendance of the biweekly market was then about 300 people.

The 1981 census recorded Rastamau as having a population of 3,941 people, in 714 households, and having an area of 712.66 hectares.

References

Villages in Raebareli district